Karl Ravens (29 June 1927 – 8 September 2017) was a German politician and member of the Social Democratic Party of Germany (SPD). He served as the Federal Minister of Regional Planning, Construction and Urban Development for West Germany from 1974 to 1978.

Ravens died on 8 September 2017, at the age of 90.

References

1927 births
2017 deaths
Construction ministers of Germany
Federal government ministers of Germany
Members of the Bundestag for Lower Saxony
Members of the Bundestag 1976–1980
Members of the Bundestag 1972–1976
Members of the Bundestag 1969–1972
Members of the Bundestag 1965–1969
Members of the Bundestag 1961–1965
Grand Crosses with Star and Sash of the Order of Merit of the Federal Republic of Germany
Members of the Bundestag for the Social Democratic Party of Germany
People from Verden (district)